Aphnaeus marshalli, the Marshall's highflier, is a butterfly in the family Lycaenidae. It is found in Tanzania (from the south-western part of the country to Kigoma), the Democratic Republic of the Congo (from the south-eastern part of the country to Katanga Province), Zambia and north-eastern Zimbabwe. The habitat consists of Brachystegia woodland.

Both sexes mud-puddle. Adults are on wing in September and October.

The larvae feed on Julbernardia globiflora and Brachystegia boehmii.

References

External links
Die Gross-Schmetterlinge der Erde 13: Die Afrikanischen Tagfalter. Plate XIII 69 d

Butterflies described in 1910
Aphnaeus